Hugo Colace may refer to:

Hugo Colace (cinematographer) (born 1953), Argentine cinematographer
Hugo Colace (footballer) (born 1984), Argentine footballer